The 1953 Tour de Romandie was the seventh edition of the Tour de Romandie cycle race and was held from 7 May to 10 May 1953. The race started and finished in Martigny. The race was won by Hugo Koblet.

General classification

References

1953
Tour de Romandie